Events in the year 1892 in Belgium.

Incumbents
Monarch: Leopold II
Prime Minister: Auguste Marie François Beernaert

Events
 22 May – Provincial elections
 14 June – Belgian general election, 1892

Publications
 Iwan Gilkin, Ténèbres (Brussels, Edmond Deman)
 Prosper de Haulleville, Portraits et silhouettes, vol.1
 Emile Vandervelde, Les associations professionelles d'artisans et d'ouvriers en Belgique

Art and architecture

Buildings
 Jean-Baptiste Bethune, Maredsous Abbey (begun 1872)

Paintings
 Théo van Rysselberghe, An Evening

Births
 28 October – Marthe Cnockaert, spy and writer (died 1966)

Deaths
 30 August – Lucien Bia (born 1852) soldier

References

 
1890s in Belgium